is a private university in Sendai, Miyagi, Japan. The predecessor of the school, a law school, was founded in 1900. In 1947 it was promoted to a women's vocational school. A year later, an attached women's high school was established. It was re-established as a women's junior college in 1951. In 1958 a four-year college opened. In 1987, it became coeducational, adopting the name "Tohoku Seikatsu Bunka College" at the same time.

External links
 Official website 

Educational institutions established in 1900
Private universities and colleges in Japan
Universities and colleges in Miyagi Prefecture
1900 establishments in Japan